Brad Banks (born April 22, 1980) is a former American football quarterback. He played college football at Iowa where he was the runner-up for the Heisman Trophy.

Early years
Banks attended Glades Central High School where he was a First-team All-Conference and All-State selection as a junior and senior. He was also a team captain all three years. He helped Belle Glade Glades Central win the state high school championship as a senior. He was a three-time football letterman and lettered twice in track.

College career

Central Florida
Banks originally attended the University of Central Florida but transferred after his red-shirt freshman year.

Hinds CC
Banks transferred to Hinds Community College where he played Wide receiver as a JUCO freshman. He played quarterback as a sophomore and helped lead the team to an 11-1 record. Hinds was ranked as high as #4 nationally. Hinds won the State Junior College title his sophomore season as he passed for 2,192 yards (third in school history for passing yards in a single season) and rushed for 343 yards while recording 13 rushing touchdowns. He also passed for 16 touchdowns as a sophomore. After two seasons at Hinds, he transferred to the University of Iowa.

Banks was later named to the school's Team of the Decade.

Iowa
Banks played in 10 games in 2001 and was 41-of-68 (60.3%) for 582 yards, four touchdowns and two interceptions. He also carried the ball 41 times for 151 yards and two touchdowns. Then as a senior in 2002, his first career start came in the season-opener against Akron and he started all 13 games during the season. For the season he completed 170-of-294 (57.8%) for 2,573 yards, 26 touchdowns and seven interceptions. He helped lead the Hawkeyes to an 11-2 record and a tie for the conference championship with Ohio State. Had Iowa not lost to Iowa State they would have been undefeated in regular season and may have been selected to play in the Fiesta Bowl for the BCS championship. The Hawkeyes finished the season #8 in the AP Poll. Also, he was the runner-up for the Heisman Trophy. He won the Davey O'Brien Award as the nation's best Quarterback. He was named AP College Football Player of the Year, Walter Camp Foundation First-team All-America, Second-team All-America by the AP, Second-team All-America by The Sporting News, Second-team All-America by CNNSI.com. He also earned the Chicago Tribune Silver Football Award as the Big Ten Conference's Most Valuable Player. He was named the Big Ten Conference Offensive Player of the Year, one of three finalists for Maxwell Award, one of 10 finalists for Walter Camp Foundation Player of the Year, First-team All-Conference, a permanent team captain on offense, Co-Offensive MVP, Hayden Fry "Extra Heartbeat" Award winner. He was also selected to play in East/West Shrine Game and Hula Bowl.

College statistics

Professional career

Washington Redskins
Banks went unselected in the 2003 NFL Draft. He signed with the Washington Redskins after the draft, but was released shortly afterwards.

Ottawa Renegades
In 2004, Banks signed with the Ottawa Renegades of the Canadian Football League (CFL).

Winnipeg Blue Bombers
In 2005 was selected by the Winnipeg Blue Bombers in Ottawa's Player dispersal draft. Then on May 16, 2007, he, along with fellow quarterback Matt Bohnet re-signed with the Blue Bombers.

Montreal Alouettes
In June 2007, Banks was traded to the Montreal Alouettes in exchange for quarterback Kliff Kingsbury.

Iowa Barnstormers
On January 31, 2011, Brad was assigned to the Iowa Barnstormers of Arena Football League (AFL). On April 1, 2011, Banks set a Barnstormers single game record in touchdowns with an 11 TD (10 passing, 1 rushing) performance against the San Jose SaberCats at the HP Pavilion. Iowa won 76-69.

CFL stats

Arena stats

Personal life
Banks is a cousin of former Tennessee, College of the Sequoias, Ole Miss and Central Valley Coyotes quarterback Brent Schaeffer. He is also a cousin of wide receiver Anquan Boldin.

References

Further reading
Hawkeye Sports News - Where are they now? Brad Banks
 Former Hawkeye quarterback to host camp in Iowa City, joins Nighthawks.

External links

 Iowa profile

1980 births
Living people
American football quarterbacks
Canadian football quarterbacks
Hinds Eagles football players
Iowa Barnstormers players
Iowa Hawkeyes football players
Montreal Alouettes players
Ottawa Renegades players
UCF Knights football players
Washington Redskins players
People from Belle Glade, Florida
Players of American football from Florida
Sportspeople from the Miami metropolitan area